Molecules of Motion is a studio album by Steve Roach, released on June 1, 2018.

It was nominated for Best New Age Album at the 61st Annual Grammy Awards.

Track listing
 "Molecules of Motion" - 24:21
 "Grace Meditation" - 23:39
 "Phase Reverie" - 10:11
 "Empath Current" - 15:02

Track listing adapted from the iTunes Store

References

2018 albums
Steve Roach (musician) albums